5th Missouri Cavalry Regiment may refer to the following units in the American Civil War:

5th Missouri Cavalry Regiment (Union)
5th Missouri Cavalry Regiment (Confederate), a Confederate unit from Missouri